Benacoceras is a strongly ribbed, evolute ammonite from the Late Jurassic, coiled so that all whorls are exposed. Ribbing is biplicate, with very short secondaries. The venter, the outer rim, is smooth, at least on the outer whorl.

References
Notes

Bibliography
Treatise on Invertebrate Paleontology, Part L; Ch. Mesozoic Ammonoidea. Geological Soc of America and U Kansas Press, R.C Moore (ed)

Jurassic ammonites
Kimmeridgian life